The 1983 Chicago Cubs season was the 112th season of the Chicago Cubs franchise, the 108th in the National League and the 68th at Wrigley Field. The Cubs finished fifth in the National League East with a record of 71–91.

Offseason 
 October 15, 1982: Herman Segelke was traded by the Cubs to the San Francisco Giants for Alan Hargesheimer.
 December 9, 1982: Steve Henderson was traded by the Cubs to the Seattle Mariners for Rich Bordi.
 December 10, 1982: Wayne Nordhagen was signed as a free agent by the Cubs.
 January 19, 1983: Dan Cataline and Vance Lovelace were traded by the Cubs to the Los Angeles Dodgers for Ron Cey.
 January 25, 1983: Scott Fletcher, Pat Tabler, Randy Martz, and Dick Tidrow were traded by the Cubs to the Chicago White Sox for Steve Trout and Warren Brusstar.
 February 7, 1983: Butch Benton was traded by the Cubs to the Montreal Expos for Jerry Manuel.

Regular season

Season standings

Record vs. opponents

Notable transactions 
 April 1, 1983: The Cubs traded a player to be named later and cash to the Milwaukee Brewers for Steve Lake. The Cubs completed the deal by sending Rich Buonantony (minors) to the Brewers on October 24.
 May 22, 1983: Willie Hernández was traded by the Cubs to the Philadelphia Phillies for Dick Ruthven and Bill Johnson.
 June 9, 1983: Wayne Nordhagen was released by the Cubs.
 June 28, 1983: Rick Reuschel was signed as a free agent by the Cubs.

Draft picks 
 June 6, 1983: 1983 Major League Baseball draft
Rich Amaral was drafted by the Cubs in the 2nd round. Player signed June 10, 1983.
Jacob Brumfield was drafted by the Cubs in the 7th round. Player signed June 9, 1983.

Roster

Player stats

Batting

Starters by position 
Note: Pos = Position; G = Games played; AB = At bats; H = Hits; Avg. = Batting average; HR = Home runs; RBI = Runs batted in

Other batters 
Note: G = Games played; AB = At bats; H = Hits; Avg. = Batting average; HR = Home runs; RBI = Runs batted in

Pitching

Starting pitchers 
Note: G = Games pitched; IP = Innings pitched; W = Wins; L = Losses; ERA = Earned run average; SO = Strikeouts

Other pitchers 
Note: G = Games pitched; IP = Innings pitched; W = Wins; L = Losses; ERA = Earned run average; SO = Strikeouts

Relief pitchers 
Note: G = Games pitched; W = Wins; L = Losses; SV = Saves; ERA = Earned run average; SO = Strikeouts

Awards and honors

Records 
 Bill Buckner, National League record (since broken), Most Assists in One Season (161)

Farm system

Notes

References 

1983 Chicago Cubs season at Baseball Reference

Chicago Cubs seasons
Chicago Cubs season
Chicago